Charles Holmes (19 September 1711 – 21 November 1761) was a Rear Admiral in the British Navy during the Seven Years' War, and was Wolfe's third-in-command during the capture of Quebec in 1759. He is also known for leading a British squadron up the River Ems in 1758, leading directly to the Capture of Emden.

Early life
Holmes was the fourth son of Colonel Henry Holmes, Lieutenant-Governor of the Isle of Wight, and his maternal grandfather had been Admiral Sir Robert Holmes, one of England's most noted naval leaders during the Anglo-Dutch Wars of the previous century who had overseen Holmes' Bonfire. Joining the navy at the age of 16, he was promoted to lieutenant in 1734 and received his first command in 1741.

In 1747 Holmes was given command of HMS Lenox, one of the biggest warships in the navy, but peace was signed the following year and he would serve for the next few years in British waters.

Seven Years' War

When the Seven Years' War broke out, he was commanding HMS Grafton, and was sent under Admiral Holburne to reinforce Admiral Boscawen's force in the Atlantic, assisting in the interception of a French squadron bound for North America and the capture of the Alcide and the Lys in April 1755.

In 1758 Holmes was sent as Commodore of a small squadron (two frigates, a cutter and a bomb ketch) to the Ems where, despite one of the frigates running aground in the river and having to be sent home, he succeeded in capturing Emden from the French. Soon afterwards he was promoted to rear admiral, and the following year was appointed third-in-command under Admiral Saunders of the naval expedition up the St Lawrence river to besiege Quebec, his flagship being HMS Lowestoffe. He succeeded in getting a squadron of ships and troop transports past the French batteries, and was therefore able to put Wolfe and his troops ashore beyond the city, safely and in absolute silence, allowing its eventual capture after the Battle of the Plains of Abraham.

In March 1760, Holmes was appointed Commander-in-Chief of the Jamaica Station, during his time there his fleet destroyed a French convoy in the Windward Passage in October 1760. Holmes died in Jamaica in November 1761. There is a memorial to him in Westminster Abbey.

Holmes was elected Member of Parliament for Newport, Isle of Wight in 1758, and held the seat until his death three years later. (Two of his brothers, General Henry Holmes and Thomas Holmes were also MPs for Isle of Wight constituencies.) He was also a member of the court martial that tried and condemned Admiral Byng in 1757. He was a known patron of brothel keeper Jane Douglas.

Genealogy

 Henry Holmes of Mallow, Cork, Ireland
 Colonel Thomas Holmes of Kilmallock, Limerick, Ireland
 Henry Holmes (–1738) m. Mary Holmes (daughter of Admiral Sir Robert Holmes)
  Thomas Holmes, 1st Baron Holmes (1699–1764)
 Lieutenant General Henry Holmes (1703–62)
 Rear Admiral Charles Holmes (1711–1761)
 Elizabeth Holmes m. Thomas Troughear
 Leonard (Troughear) Holmes, 1st Baron Holmes (–1804) m. Elizabeth Tyrrell (d.1810)
 The Hon. Elizabeth Holmes m. Edward Rushout
 Descendants
 Admiral Sir Robert Holmes (–1692), English Admiral
 Mary Holmes (wife of Henry Holmes)
 Admiral Sir John Holmes (1640?–1683), English Admiral leader

References

Sources

Further reading
 Oliver Warner, With Wolfe to Quebec (Toronto: William Collins, 1972)
 Basil Williams, The Whig Supremacy 1714-1760 (Oxford: Oxford University Press, 1962)

External links
 
 University of Waterloo library - facsimile and transcript of Holmes' dispatch to London reporting the capture of Quebec

1711 births
1761 deaths
Royal Navy admirals
British military personnel of the French and Indian War
Members of Parliament for Newport (Isle of Wight)